Fire Twister (also known in Germany as Fire Twister - Feuerhölle L.A.) is a 2015 American-Canadian low-budget action-adventure-disaster-sci-fi film directed by George Erschbamer. The film received poor ratings due to poor production quality.

Plot

As part of an eco group, Scott, an ex-firefighter, Carla, a climate specialist, Barbie and Jason go to hang up an anti-oil advertisement banner on a large storage tank on top of a hill inside a Synco compound. They find a bomb on the tank, planted by the Central Intelligence Agency (CIA), and run away as it explodes. The explosion creates a fire twister which passes down to the town below causing a vast amount of destruction.

Two CIA agents start shooting at Scott and his companions; they run and manage to hide behind some trees. They find Anthony, a chief engineer at Synco, who confesses they have been making a new hydrogen fuel (MT-11), which was stored in the tank that exploded. He says this fuel burns for a long time and that the twister will keep getting bigger.

Scott's group and Anthony follow the twister in their car, into the town. They find the twister coming toward them, and jump out of their car as it is swept into the twister. The twister destroys a house and continues through the town. Scott and his group survive unhurt, but many other people have been injured. Scott rescues a woman from a tree; she then lets them borrow her car. The CIA agents re-appear, shooting at Scott's group as they drive off. Anthony surmises that the twister is attracted to heat. Scott phones a colleague from the fire service and gives him the information on the twister.

Mr. Garber, the Synco CEO, is interviewed by the press and blames the twister on Scott and Carla. A Synco employee speaks out on the news saying the fuel was only moved a couple of days ago, and that this tank wasn't rated to safely hold the MT-11 fuel. Garber speaks to V, one of the CIA agents, on the phone, instructing her to kill Scott.

The twister hits Los Angeles destroying many buildings and incinerating people alive. Scott follows the twister into the city. They see a car accident and get out to help, but it turns out to be a trap set by the CIA agents who take Scott and his group as hostages. Jason admits that the CEO of Synco paid him to get Scott to put the anti-oil banner on the tank so they could all be framed for the explosion. Jason grabs a gun off one of the CIA agents and buys time for Scott and his group to escape; he is then, killed by the agents. Anthony and Scott realize that Garber may have been placed at Synco by a rival company to sabotage the business.

Anthony hooks up some fuel canisters to the top of a car, and drives toward the twister, planning to destroy it. He sets off an explosion at the base of the twister, killing himself and making the twister bigger. Scott realizes that a large explosion would destroy the twister, so he works out a plan to attract the twister into an open area and set off a large explosion using C4 and a fire engine full of fuel. They turn the fire hoses into flamethrowers, creating heat to attract the twister.

A reporter sneaks into the Synco compound and sees the staff clearing everything out. She learns that Garber is behind the explosion and creation of the fire twister, and that he has been paid a much money to do it. Garber finds the reporter in his office, and kills her with a golf club.

Scott drives the fire engine toward the twister; Carla and Barbie use the flamethrowers to attract the twister toward them. They lure the twister to the Synco compound. The CIA agents defend the compound and shoot at Scott, but he drives straight past them into the compound, and the agents are killed by the following twister. Garber gets a helicopter so he can escape, however the helicopter is sucked into the twister before it can pick him up. Scott sets up the C4 and jumps out of the fire engine, and it explodes at the base of the twister, destroying it. An axe flies out of the explosion, killing Garber.

Cast
 Casper Van Dien as Scott, Ex-Firefighter
 Lisa Ciara as Carla, Climate Scientist
 Johnny Hawkes as Jason, Member of The Eco Group
 Leah Bateman as Barbie, Member of The Eco Group
 Jon Mack as CIA Agent "V"
 Jeff Clarke as Anthony, Chief Engineer At Synco 
 Joe Regalbuto as Mitch Garber, CEO At Synco

Reception

Letterboxd and The Movie Scene both gave the film a rating of 1/5. Radio Times gave the film a rating of 2/5.

References

External links
 

2015 science fiction action films
2010s disaster films
American disaster films
American science fiction action films
Canadian disaster films
Canadian science fiction action films
CineTel Films films
English-language Canadian films
Films about fires
Films about the Central Intelligence Agency
Films about tornadoes
Films set in Los Angeles
Films set in Los Angeles County, California
Films shot in Canada
Films shot in Los Angeles
2010s English-language films
2010s American films
2010s Canadian films